Myrath ( mīrāth, "Legacy") is a Tunisian progressive metal band formed in 2001 by guitarist Malek Ben Arbia and currently based in Tunisia. The band has been noted for its mix of Arabic and Middle Eastern instrumentation with power metal and progressive rock and is considered an important band in oriental metal. They call their own sound "blazing desert metal". They are the first band from Tunisia to be signed to a record label outside the country.

Career

Early history 
Guitarist Malek Ben Arbia, then age 13, formed the band, first named X-Tazy, in 2001 with some childhood friends. The band played covers of blues, heavy metal, and death metal songs. Amongst numerous lineup changes, keyboardist/singer Elyes Bouchoucha joined in 2003 and became a permanent member. They eventually moved toward a progressive metal and oriental metal sound. In 2005 they released the EP Double Face via USB flash drives in Tunisia. The album gained some notice in Europe, leading to a contract with France's Bremmis Music. Now known as Myrath, the band became the first Tunisian act to sign with a European label. During this period they met French musician Kevin Codfert, who has been their producer ever since. 

Their first album under the name Myrath, produced by Codfert, was Hope in 2007. At this time the band included Arbia and Bouchoucha with bassist Anis Jouini, who became a permanent member, plus drummer Saif Louhibi. Shortly after the release of Hope, singer Zaher Zorgati joined the band and took over lead vocals from Bouchoucha. Zorgati's ability to combine Islamic chants with heavy metal wailing became a key component of Myrath's sound, while the band's lyrics began to focus on Tunisian folklore.

The album Desert Call was released in 2010; this album's sound was compared favorably to that of Orphaned Land. Tales of the Sands followed in 2011. Drummer Morgan Berthet joined the band in 2012, forming a stable lineup for the next several years. They began to play European summer festivals regularly, and their first American appearance was at the ProgPower USA festival in 2013.

International recognition 

Myrath opened for Symphony X during a high-profile tour of England in 2016. The album Legacy, featuring lyrics contributed by Tunisian poets, was released later in 2016. Also that year, Zorgati made a guest appearance on the album The Source by Ayreon. Myrath then toured around the world consistently for more than two years and appeared at several international music festivals. During this period they signed an international deal with EarMusic.

In 2017, Myrath performed in their native Tunisia for the first time in three years with a concert at the historic Theatre of Carthage. This performance was recorded for the live album Live in Carthage, released in 2019. Their fifth studio album Shehili was also released in 2019. They appeared at the Sweden Rock Festival in 2019 as a last-minute replacement for Behemoth; and have been invited to return for future versions of the festival. They also toured with the Dutch symphonic metal band Epica in 2019. In 2021, Zorgati provided guest vocals on the track "Code of Life" on the Epica album Omega.

In July 2022 the band announced via their social media that it separated from Elyes Bouchoucha back in 2020.

Discography

Studio albums

EPs 

 2005: Double Face.

Live albums 
 2020: Live in Carthage.

Compilation albums 

 2018: Merciless Times.

Members

Current members 
 Malek Ben Arbia – guitar 
 Anis Jouini – bass guitar 
 Zaher Zorgati – lead vocals 
 Morgan Berthet – drums

Former members 
 Walid Issaoui – guitar 
 Fahmi Chakroun – drums 
 Saief Louhibi – drums 
 Yassine Belgith - bass 
 Zaher Hamoudia – bass 
 Tarek Idouani – lead vocals 
 Piwee Desfray – drums 
 Elyes Bouchoucha – keyboards, backing vocals

Live members 

 Kevin Codfert – additional pianos and guitars

Timeline

References

External links
 Myrath Website

Tunisian musical groups
Progressive metal musical groups
Oriental metal musical groups
Musical groups established in 2001
2001 establishments in Tunisia